Ralf Johan Gustaf Törngren (1 March 1899 – 16 May 1961) was a Finnish politician, born in Oulu. He was the party leader of the Swedish People's Party (1945–1955), a member of the Finnish parliament and the Prime Minister of Finland 5 May – 20 October 1954. In the Finnish presidential elections of 1956, he won 20 electoral votes.

He died in Turku, aged 62. A prize in his honor was founded in 2003 at the Åbo Akademi University in Turku, Finland.

Career
 1944–1945 Social minister
 1945–1948 Minister of Finance
 1950–1951 Social minister
 1951 Second Finance minister
 1951–1952 Social minister
 1952–1953 Second Minister for Foreign Affairs
 1953–1954 Minister of Foreign Affairs
 1954 Prime Minister
 1956–1957 Minister of Foreign Affairs
 1959–1961 Minister of Foreign Affairs
 1959–1961 Deputy Prime Minister

Cabinets
 Törngren Cabinet

References

1899 births
1961 deaths
People from Oulu
People from Oulu Province (Grand Duchy of Finland)
Swedish-speaking Finns
Swedish People's Party of Finland politicians
Prime Ministers of Finland
Deputy Prime Ministers of Finland
Ministers of Finance of Finland
Ministers for Foreign Affairs of Finland
Members of the Parliament of Finland (1936–39)
Members of the Parliament of Finland (1939–45)
Members of the Parliament of Finland (1945–48)
Members of the Parliament of Finland (1948–51)
Members of the Parliament of Finland (1951–54)
Members of the Parliament of Finland (1954–58)
Members of the Parliament of Finland (1958–62)
Finnish people of World War II
Åbo Akademi University alumni